The gare d'Hendaye is a railway station in Hendaye, France, on the Bordeaux-Irun and Madrid-Hendaye lines. The station is served by TGV high speed trains, Intercités de nuit night trains, Intercités long distance and TER local services operated by the SNCF, Trenhotel and Arco services operated by RENFE, and EuskoTren services.

The Euskotren  services operate from a station on the forecourt of the SNCF station, for which separate ticketing is required.

The electric supply also changes here from 1500 V DC (overhead France) to 3000 V DC (overhead Spain). Between the stations of Hendaye and Irun, both track gauges run together.

Train services
The following services currently call at Hendaye:
high speed services (TGV) Paris - Bordeaux - Hendaye
intercity services (Intercités) Hendaye - Bayonne - Pau - Tarbes - Toulouse
local service (TER Aquitaine) Bordeaux - Dax - Bayonne - Hendaye

See also
 Meeting at Hendaye – the only meeting between Adolf Hitler and Francisco Franco, which took place at this station on 23 October 1940
 Variable gauge

References

Railway stations in Pyrénées-Atlantiques
Euskotren Trena stations